Áodh Ó Flaithbheartaigh, Lord of Iar Connacht and Chief of the Name, died 1538.

References

 West or H-Iar Connaught Ruaidhrí Ó Flaithbheartaigh, 1684 (published 1846, ed. James Hardiman).
 Origin of the Surname O'Flaherty, Anthony Matthews, Dublin, 1968, p. 40.
 CELT: Corpus of Electronic Texts at University College Cork

People from County Galway
Medieval Gaels from Ireland
1538 deaths
Aodh
Year of birth unknown
Irish lords